Baie-Comeau (2021 city population 20,687; CA population 26,643) is a city located approximately  north-east of Quebec City in the Côte-Nord region of the province of Quebec, Canada. It is located on the shores of the Saint Lawrence River near the mouth of the Manicouagan River, and is the seat of Manicouagan Regional County Municipality.

There are two urban area population centres within the city limits: Baie-Comeau proper, with a population of 9,100, and Hauterive, with a population of 11,147, as of the 2021 Canadian Census.

The city is named after the adjacent Comeau Bay, which is named in honour of Napoléon-Alexandre Comeau, a Québécois naturalist.

Baie-Comeau is the birthplace of former Prime Minister of Canada Brian Mulroney.

History
The oldest part of Baie-Comeau is the area known as Vieux-Poste (Old Post) near the mouth of the Amédée River where in 1889, the Saint-Eugène-de-Manicouagan Mission was founded by Eudists. In 1898, the first sawmill in the Côte-Nord region was built there by the brothers Damase and Henri Jalbert, but it closed in 1907 after their timber stock was swept into the St. Lawrence.

Baie-Comeau itself (the eastern part of the current town) was founded in 1936 when a paper mill was constructed by Colonel Robert R. McCormick, publisher of the Chicago Tribune. Arthur A. Schmon oversaw the project, which included a power station and housing. Experiencing remarkable growth, the Town of Baie-Comeau was incorporated the following year. The area continued to see economic development with the establishment of the hydro-electric power stations on the Manicouagan and Outardes Rivers beginning with the Chutes-aux-Outardes Station in 1952, an aluminum smelter in 1958, and grain warehouses (the largest in Canada) in 1959.

In 1950, the village of Saint-Eugène-de-Manicouagan was incorporated as the Municipality of Hauterive. In June 1982, Hauterive was merged into Baie-Comeau, taking effect on January 1, 1983.

Baie-Comeau is the seat of the judicial district of Baie-Comeau.

Demographics

Knowledge of official languages from 2016 (multiple answers were possible):
 English: 4,415
 French: 20,840
 Other languages: 550

Economy
The region is a major forestry centre for the pulp and paper industry, owned by Abitibi Consolidated as of October 2006. Alongside hydro-electricity and the paper industry, an aluminum plant has fed employment for decades. Cargill has a large elevator there that is used to transfer grain from Great Lakes boats to ocean-going ships.

Transportation

A ferry service of the Société des traversiers du Québec and rail ferry service of the COGEMA also links the town to Matane on the south shore of the St. Lawrence River. The town is the southern terminus of Route 389, which leads to the Daniel-Johnson Dam, the town of Fermont, and the Labrador region of the province of Newfoundland and Labrador.

The Baie-Comeau Airport, located in neighbouring Pointe-Lebel, has scheduled flights from Air Liaison and Pascan Aviation.

City council
The Baie-Comeau city council consists of the mayor of Baie-Comeau and eight elected city councillors, four from each of the two sectors of town. The most recent mayor of Baie-Comeau was Yves Montigny, who was elected to the National Assembly of Quebec in the 2022 Quebec general election; his successor has not yet been determined.

Education

Baie-Comeau is home to several French-language public elementary schools, two French-language public high schools and one English-language public school that includes both the elementary and high school levels of education.

The town is also home to one French-language CEGEP called the Cégep de Baie-Comeau.

List of schools in Baie-Comeau:

Climate
Although at the same latitude as Vancouver or Paris, Baie-Comeau has a borderline humid continental climate (Köppen Dfb), just above the subarctic climate. The cold Labrador Current makes the Gulf of St. Lawrence very cold and tends to cool the weather during summer much more than the marginal warming of the winters resulting from its maritime location.

Sports

The 1993 Quebec Winter Games were played in Baie-Comeau.

Many different sports are played in Baie-Comeau:

Hockey
Baie-Comeau is home to the Baie-Comeau Drakkar, an ice hockey team playing in the Quebec Major Junior Hockey League since 1997. The team plays in the Centre Henry-Leonard located in the eastern sector of the town.

Skiing
The  is an alpine ski centre located a few kilometers north of the town where it offers twelve slopes. Cross-country skiing is also popular. Students often frequent Mont-Tibasse as part of their school programs.

Golf
An 18-hole golf course is available in the western sector of the town. It is a semi-private golf club and is open for most of the summer.

Swimming
The two major high schools of the city each offer an indoor swimming pool and are open to the public year-round. Two outdoor swimming pools are also available to the public. These are open from the end of June until the middle of August each summer.

Some beaches are also available in the summer.

Tennis
Several outdoor tennis courts are available to the public in the different parks across town. They are open for most of the summer.

Football
The Baie-Comeau Vikings represent the Polyvalente des Baies in the Saguenay-Lac-Saint-Jean League. The team won championships in the eastern Quebec circuit in 2003, 2004 and 2006, and were finalists in 2005.

See also 

 Amédée Lake
 Amédée River
 Castelnau Lake
 Côte-Nord, an administrative region of Quebec
 List of towns in Quebec
 Manicouagan Regional County Municipality
 Manicouagan River
 Rivière à la Chasse (Baie-Comeau)
 Rivière aux Anglais

References

Bibliography

External links

City of Baie-Comeau
Commission scolaire de l'Estuaire

 
Cities and towns in Quebec
Quebec populated places on the Saint Lawrence River
Hudson's Bay Company trading posts
Populated places established in 1936
1936 establishments in Quebec